Phaeothamniophycidae is a subclass of heterokont algae. It contains two orders, Phaeothamniales and Pleurochloridellales, and consists of species separated from Chrysophyceae.

Taxonomy
 Order Pleurochloridellales 
 Family Pleurochloridellaceae 
 Pleurochloridella 
 Order Phaeothamniales 
 Family Phaeothamniaceae  [=Stichogloeaceae ; Chrysapiaceae]
 Apistonema 
 Chrysapion 
 Chrysocapsopsis 
 Chrysoclonium 
 Chrysodesmis 
 Chrysodictyon 
 Koinopodion 
 Nematochrysis 
 Phaeogloea 
 Phaeoschizochlamys 
 Phaeothamnion 
 Podochrysis 
 Selenophaea 
 Sphaeridiothrix 
 Stichogloea 
 Tetrachrysis 
 Tetrapion

References

Ochrophyta
Algae classes
Heterokont classes